The Kretek Museum is a museum in Kudus Regency, Indonesia. The museum opened in 1986, and was jointly founded by several Indonesian cigarette companies. The museum focuses on the history - both economic and religious - of kretek, a type of clove cigarette common in Indonesia.

References 

Museums in Central Java
Museums established in 1986